Willy Andreas Pedersen (born 1 November 1981) is a Norwegian politician for the Labour Party.

He served as a deputy representative to the Parliament of Norway from Finnmark during the term 2009–2013. In total he met during 195 days of parliamentary session. At the end of his term, he held the status of regular representative while Helga Pedersen was a member of Stoltenberg's Second Cabinet. He has been deputy mayor of Vadsø.

References

1981 births
Living people
People from Vadsø
Members of the Storting
Labour Party (Norway) politicians
Finnmark politicians
21st-century Norwegian politicians